Britt Kelly Slabinski (born December 1, 1969) is a retired United States Navy SEAL who was awarded the Medal of Honor on May 24, 2018, for his actions during the Battle of Takur Ghar.  He also participated in the highly publicized rescue mission to recover Army PFC Jessica Lynch.

Early life
Slabinski is from Northampton, Massachusetts. He earned the rank of Eagle Scout at age 14 on March 9, 1984.

Military career
Upon graduation from Smith Vocational and Agricultural High School in 1988, Slabinski enlisted in the U.S. Navy. He attended boot camp in Orlando, Florida. Upon completion, he received orders to attend Radioman Class "A" School in San Diego, California. There, he trained on the basics of naval communications, graduating in spring 1989. He qualified and was accepted into Basic Underwater Demolition/SEAL training (BUD/S) at Naval Amphibious Base Coronado. Slabinski graduated with BUD/S class 164 in January 1990. Following SEAL Tactical Training (STT) and completion of six month probationary period, he received the NEC 5326 as a Combatant Swimmer (SEAL), entitled to wear the Special Warfare Insignia.

Slabinski's operational assignments include SEAL Team FOUR, 1990 to 1993; Naval Special Warfare Development Group (NSWDG), 1993 to 2006; and Command Master Chief of Naval Special Warfare Tactical Development and Evaluation Squadron TWO, 2006 to 2008. He was the Senior Enlisted Advisor of the Joint Special Operations Command, Washington, DC Office, 2008 to 2010 and Command Master Chief, Naval Special Warfare Group TWO, 2010 to 2012.

Slabinski has completed nine overseas deployments and 15 combat deployments in support of the Global War on Terrorism, including Operations Enduring Freedom and Iraqi Freedom. He retired in June 2014 as the Director of Naval Special Warfare Safety Assurance and Analysis Program after more than 25 years of service.

Awards and decorations

Six gold Service stripes.

Medal of Honor citation

The March 2002 ambush that resulted in Slabinski's heroic actions (now known as the Battle of Roberts Ridge) was described as one of the most savage and controversial battles of the Afghan war. The Medal of Honor awarded Slabinski is an upgrade from the Navy Cross award he previously received. In 2018, for his heroism during the same battle, TSgt John Chapman was posthumously awarded the Medal of Honor  (he was "the one teammate [who] started moving uphill toward an enemy strongpoint").

Personal life
Slabinski has an Emergency Medical Technician/Paramedic National Certification. He is self-employed as a corporate consultant. He has one son, Bryce (born 1996), who is also an Eagle Scout and  Ohio State graduate.

Slabinski appeared in the Spring 2019 issue of the American Battlefield Trust's magazine Hallowed Ground, writing about his visit to the Fredericksburg and Spotsylvania National Military Park.

References

1969 births
United States Navy personnel of the Iraq War
Living people
Military personnel from Massachusetts
People from Northampton, Massachusetts
Recipients of the Navy and Marine Corps Medal
United States Navy Medal of Honor recipients
United States Navy SEALs personnel
War in Afghanistan (2001–2021) recipients of the Medal of Honor
United States Navy sailors